Lyubini is a rural locality (a village) located in Bezhetsky District of Tver Oblast, Russia.

References

Rural localities in Bezhetsky District